The 1959 Western Michigan Broncos baseball team represented Western Michigan University in the 1959 NCAA University Division baseball season. The Broncos played their home games at Hyames Field. The team was coached by Charlie Maher in his 21st year at Western Michigan.

The Broncos won the District IV playoff to advanced to the College World Series, where they were defeated by the Fresno State Bulldogs.

Roster

Schedule 

! style="" | Regular Season
|- valign="top" 

|- align="center" bgcolor="#ffcccc"
| 1 || March 30 || vs  || Seminole Field • Tallahassee, Florida || 1–4 || 0–1 || –
|- align="center" bgcolor="#ccffcc"
| 2 || March 31 || at  || Seminole Field • Tallahassee, Florida || 3–2 || 1–1 || –
|-

|- align="center" bgcolor="#ccffcc"
| 3 || April 1 || vs  || Seminole Field • Tallahassee, Florida || 9–1 || 2–1 || –
|- align="center" bgcolor="#ccffcc"
| 4 || April 2 || vs  || Seminole Field • Tallahassee, Florida || 7–6 || 3–1 || –
|- align="center" bgcolor="#ccffcc"
| 5 || April 2 || vs Michigan || Seminole Field • Tallahassee, Florida || 9–7 || 4–1 || –
|- align="center" bgcolor="#ffcccc"
| 6 || April 3 || at Florida State || Seminole Field • Tallahassee, Florida || 0–2 || 4–2 || –
|- align="center" bgcolor="#ccffcc"
| 7 || April 4 || vs  || Seminole Field • Tallahassee, Florida || 5–3 || 5–2 || –
|- align="center" bgcolor="#ccffcc"
| 8 || April 13 ||  || Hyames Field • Kalamazoo, Michigan || 6–5 || 6–2 || –
|- align="center" bgcolor="#ccffcc"
| 9 || April 14 || Iowa || Hyames Field • Kalamazoo, Michigan || 6–2 || 7–2 || –
|- align="center" bgcolor="#ccffcc"
| 10 || April 17 || at  || Unknown • Bowling Green, Ohio || 9–1 || 8–2 || 1–0
|- align="center" bgcolor="#ccffcc"
| 11 || April 18 || at Bowling Green || Unknown • Bowling Green, Ohio || 6–1 || 9–2 || 2–0
|- align="center" bgcolor="#ccffcc"
| 12 || April 21 || Michigan State || Hyames Field • Kalamazoo, Michigan || 6–1 || 10–2 || 2–0
|- align="center" bgcolor="#ccffcc"
| 13 || April 24 || at  || Unknown • Toledo, Ohio || 11–6 || 11–2 || 3–0
|- align="center" bgcolor="#ccffcc"
| 14 || April 25 || at Toledo || Unknown • Toledo, Ohio || 18–13 || 12–2 || 4–0
|-

|- align="center" bgcolor="#ccffcc"
| 15 || May 1 ||  || Hyames Field • Kalamazoo, Michigan || 7–0 || 13–2 || 5–0
|- align="center" bgcolor="#ccffcc"
| 16 || May 2 || Miami (OH) || Hyames Field • Kalamazoo, Michigan || 17–1 || 14–2 || 6–0
|- align="center" bgcolor="#ffcccc"
| 17 || May 4 || at  || Guy Lowman Field • Madison, Wisconsin || 3–5 || 14–3 || 6–0
|- align="center" bgcolor="#ccffcc"
| 18 || May 5 || at Wisconsin || Guy Lowman Field • Madison, Wisconsin || 8–6 || 15–3 || 6–0
|- align="center" bgcolor="#ccffcc"
| 19 || May 8 ||  || Hyames Field • Kalamazoo, Michigan || 10–0 || 16–3 || 7–0
|- align="center" bgcolor="#ffcccc"
| 20 || May 9 || Kent State || Hyames Field • Kalamazoo, Michigan || 2–12 || 16–4 || 7–1
|- align="center" bgcolor="#ccffcc"
| 21 || May 12 || at  || Ray Fisher Stadium • Ann Arbor, Michigan || 7–1 || 17–4 || 7–1
|- align="center" bgcolor="#ccffcc"
| 22 || May 16 ||  || Hyames Field • Kalamazoo, Michigan || 3–0 || 18–4 || 7–1
|- align="center" bgcolor="#ffcccc"
| 23 || May 22 ||  || Hyames Field • Kalamazoo, Michigan || 3–7 || 18–5 || 7–2
|- align="center" bgcolor="#ccffcc"
| 24 || May 26 || Ohio || Hyames Field • Kalamazoo, Michigan || 4–3 || 19–5 || 8–2
|-

|-
|-
! style="" | Postseason
|- valign="top"

|- align="center" bgcolor="#ffcccc"
| 25 || May 28 || vs  || Cartier Field • Notre Dame, Indiana || 4–6 || 19–6 || 8–2
|- align="center" bgcolor="#ccffcc"
| 26 || May 29 || vs  || Cartier Field • Notre Dame, Indiana || 4–0 || 20–6 || 8–2
|- align="center" bgcolor="#ccffcc"
| 27 || May 29 || vs Minnesota || Cartier Field • Notre Dame, Indiana || 5–1 || 21–6 || 8–2
|- align="center" bgcolor="#ccffcc"
| 28 || May 30 || at Notre Dame || Cartier Field • Notre Dame, Indiana || 2–0 || 22–6 || 8–2
|- align="center" bgcolor="#ccffcc"
| 29 || May 30 || at Notre Dame || Cartier Field • Notre Dame, Indiana || 9–6 || 23–6 || 8–2
|-

|- align="center" bgcolor="#ffcccc"
| 30 || June 6 || at Michigan State || Old College Field • East Lansing, Michigan || 0–8 || 23–7 || 8–2
|-

|- align="center" bgcolor="#ffcccc"
| 31 || June 12 || vs Oklahoma State || Omaha Municipal Stadium • Omaha, Nebraska || 2–10 || 23–8 || 8–2
|- align="center" bgcolor="#ccffcc"
| 32 || June 14 || vs Connecticut || Omaha Municipal Stadium • Omaha, Nebraska || 14–6 || 24–8 || 8–2
|- align="center" bgcolor="#ffcccc"
| 33 || June 15 || vs Fresno State || Omaha Municipal Stadium • Omaha, Nebraska || 2–7 || 24–9 || 8–2
|-

Awards and honors 
Larry Belanger
 First Team All-MAC

Larry Buchanon
 First Team All-MAC

Len Grabowski
 Second Team All-MAC

Bill Topp
 First Team All-MAC

References 

Western Michigan Broncos baseball seasons
Western Michigan Broncos baseball
College World Series seasons
Western Michigan
Mid-American Conference baseball champion seasons